Khirbat Faynan, known in late Roman and Byzantine texts as Phaino or Phaeno, is an archaeological site in Wadi Faynan, southern Jordan. It lies just south of the Dead Sea in Jordan. The site was an ancient copper mine that overlooks two Wadis and is the location of one of the best and most well preserved ancient mining and metallurgy districts in the world.

Site Description and Excavation

Site Description 
Khirbat Faynan is located near Wadi Faynan, 215 kilometres from Amman. It was built between Wadi Dana and Wadi Ghuwayr. The site itself was one of the biggest copper mines in the Roman Empire.

Excavation 
The German Mining Museum in Bochum, Germany was the first to conduct an intensive research on the site in 1983.They were the first excavation to be sent out to the site, and the first ones to record what the site was used for. Upon their findings during the excavation, they recorded that the mining and smelting dated back to the Chalcolithic period around 4500-3100 BCE. The site had been mined continuously until around the 400 CE, however archaeological data gathered at the site along with corresponding studies show that there was a final phase of mining during the Mamluk Period which took place between 1250 to 1516 CE.

History and archaeology

Early Bronze Age 
The environment in Faynan had become increasingly arid around 4,000 BCE, as the settlement expanded out into the main wadi. During the Early Bronze Age which was approximately 3,500 BCE, more structured systems of irrigated farming had been developed due to the aridity of the area. These field systems are still visible and conserve many elements of the earliest irrigation systems and techniques used during this time. While mining for metals as well as ore processing began to intensify in Khirbat Faynan during the Iron Age, both practices in farming and irrigation as well as smelting had become more sophisticated under the Nabatean kingdom.

Bronze and Iron Ages
Located at the confluence of Wadi Dana and Wadi Ghuwayr, the settlement was occupied from the Early Bronze Age, with carbon dating showing activity at the site as early as 10,900 BCE.

The mining and smelting activities intensified during the Iron Age.

In the Bible
The site has been identified with biblical Punon, one of the stations of the Exodus.

Nabataean period
In the time of the Nabataean kingdom, both the farming and smelting activities reached a new degree of sophistication. The site drastically increased in activity when the Roman Empire had successfully annexed the Nabatean Kingdom in 106 CE.

Roman and Byzantine periods
In the Roman and Byzantine periods, it was the center of the area's extensive copper mining complex, the largest in the Southern Levant.

Early Christian authors including Eusebius and Athanasius of Alexandria wrote of large numbers of Christians being deported to Phaeno, where they suffered under terrible conditions or suffered martyrdom.

Today 
Due to Faynan's location, the site is in a dry desert region that barely gets any rainfall. Faynan receives approximately 50mm of every year, which is significantly lower than its neighboring area in the Highlands of Jordan which averages 102-300mm of rainfall each year. This puts Faynan in the category of a hyper-arid zone.

Remains of what used to be a water management and water storage systems are still visible and are located along the south bank of the Wadi Ghuweir, which is opposite of Khirbat Faynan. The remains consist of an open channel, an aqueduct across Wadi Sheger, and includes a large and sunken reservoir.

References

Ancient archaeological sites
Archaeological sites in Jordan